This is a list of chapters of Yu-Gi-Oh! Duel Monsters GX, written by Naoyuki Kageyama and one of the manga spin-off Yu-Gi-Oh! titles published by Shueisha and serialized by V-Jump. It is based on the anime Yu-Gi-Oh! Duel Monsters GX (released in the U.S. without the "Duel Monsters" subtitle). It began serialization in V-Jump on December 17, 2005, while the first volume was released on November 2, 2006. This series was licensed in North America by Viz Media, with Yu-Gi-Oh! GX having started publication in Shonen Jump in December 2006 and with the first English volume released on November 6, 2007.

Chapter list

Chapter not in volume format

References

Yu-Gi-Oh! GX
GX